"The Day It Rained Forever" is a single by Aurora with vocals by Lizzy Pattinson. It reached number 29 on the UK Singles Chart in 2002.

Music video
The video for the single features Sacha and Simon playing guitar and keyboard with Lizzy singing in a house that is floating on a seemingly infinite ocean. Filmed in Cape Town, South Africa.

Track listing
UK CDM (2002)
 The Day It Rained Forever (Radio Edit) (4:14)
 The Day It Rained Forever (Lasgo Vocal) (8:09)
 The Day It Rained Forever (Flip & Fill Vocal) (6:46)

UK CD (Enhanced) (2002)
The Day It Rained Forever (Radio Edit) (4:14) 
Your Mistake (Radio Edit 2) (2:54) 
In My Skin (3:52) 
Video - The Day It Rained Forever

UK 12" Vinyl (Double) (2002)
The Day It Rained Forever (Thick Club Mix) 
The Day It Rained Forever (Deep In My Head Mix) 
The Day It Rained Forever (Thick Dub) 
The Day It Rained Forever (Deep In My Dub Mix)

UK 12" Vinyl (Double) Promo (2002)
The Day It Rained Forever (Lasgo Vocal) 
The Day It Rained Forever (Flip & Fill Vocal) 
The Day It Rained Forever (Monoboy Dubstramental) 
The Day It Rained Forever (Monoboy Vocal) 
The Day It Rained Forever (Flip & Fill Instrumental) 
The Day It Rained Forever (Radio Edit) 
The Day It Rained Forever (Flip & Fill Radio Edit)

UK 12" Vinyl (2002)
The Day It Rained Forever (Lasgo Vocal) (8:09) 
The Day It Rained Forever (Flip & Fill Vocal) (6:46)

External links
The Day It Rained Forever at Discogs
 http://www.sachacollisson.com

Aurora (electronica band) songs
2002 singles
Songs written by Steve Robson
2002 songs
EMI Records singles